The 1990 Commonwealth Games were held in Auckland, New Zealand from 24 January – 3 February 1990. It was the 14th Commonwealth Games, and part of New Zealand's 1990 sesquicentennial celebrations. Participants competed in ten sports: athletics, aquatics, badminton, boxing, cycling, gymnastics, judo, lawn bowls, shooting and weightlifting. Netball and the Triathlon were demonstration events.

The main venue was the Mount Smart Stadium.

Host selection
The Games were awarded to Auckland on 27 July 1984 at the Los Angeles Summer Olympics in the US. Perth, Australia, had withdrawn from the bid contest leaving New Delhi, India, as the sole opponent to Auckland's bid. New Delhi lost the hosting rights to Auckland by a margin of 1 vote, which made it the closest host selection vote in the history of Commonwealth Games

Opening ceremony
The opening of the games comprised a variety of events, including the arrival of The Queen's representative The Prince Edward (her youngest son), the arrival of the Queen's Baton, and many Māori ceremonial stories. The Queens Baton was carried across the Auckland Harbour by the vessel "Ceduna".

The opening ceremony itself started off with the Auckland Commonwealth Games Choir singing the Song of Welcome. Upon the arrival of The Prince Edward, the Māori in attendance, gave him a Challenge of a welcome. This is conducted by a Māori placing a wooden baton on the ground. To see if the visitor comes in peace or not, the visitor must pick it up.

The New Zealand national anthem "God Defend New Zealand" was sung during a ceremonial fourteen gun salute from nearby One Tree Hill. This was followed by the New Zealand Army Guard Commander allowing The Prince Edward to inspect the guard of honour. After which was the introduction of the participating countries of the Commonwealth, Scotland entering first as the hosts of the previous games, and New Zealand entering last as hosts. During the introduction of the countries, the choir would display the flag of the announced country with boards.

When all the athletes finally sat down, the main Māori ceremonies began. First of the Māori ceremonies was all the Māori women performing a "Song of Welcome" for the athletes with the use of Poi. The Māori women then gave some of the athletes a Hongi. Next was the Māori story of how New Zealand was formed according to legend; it a narration of how the Polynesians found their way to what was to become New Zealand, and how New Zealand was formed between Rangi and Papa, the sky father and earth mother. The story then moved on to the coming of religion and European migration. This was demonstrated with a formation of the Union Jack, to show the colonisation by the British. Dame Whina Cooper then made a speech about the Treaty of Waitangi signed in 1840 that brought about peace and stability of modern New Zealand.

Introduction of the European communities was next with music and native dancing from European countries such as Italy, Poland, Greece, Netherlands, Scotland, Ireland, Austria, Wales and England, and music and native dancing also from Asian countries such as China, Sri Lanka and India. From here, many of the neighbouring Pacific Islanders made their entrance with the rhythmic tempo of the Pacific Island drum beat. This was to show the then complete migration of people to New Zealand.

Howard Morrison then lead New Zealand in singing the folk song Tukua-a-hau. After Morrison, the Queen's Baton arrived at the stadium where Prince Edward announced the opening of the games which was followed by the Athletes Pledge.

Fireworks followed and was capped off with a night time flyover by nine A-4 Skyhawk jets of the Royal New Zealand Air Forces 75 Squadron. The ceremony was concluded by the singing of the game's motto "This is the moment" as performers and athletes exited the stadium.

Closing ceremony
A more relaxed affair was held for the 14th Commonwealth Games closing ceremony, reflecting that of Christchurch in 1974. Attended by HM The Queen of New Zealand, formality and respect played their due part in the beginning with formal salute and the acceptance of the Commonwealth Games flag to the next host city, Victoria, Canada. This was followed by a First Nations and modern Canadian dancing display.

Next,thousands of children entered the stadium with a mass skipping rope demonstration, followed by the athletes. The Queen then made the traditional closing speech and called for all the Commonwealth's athletes to assemble in four years time in Victoria. As the evening wore on, opera singer Dame Kiri Te Kanawa sang "Now is the Hour", a favourite New Zealand hymn, as the Royal New Zealand Air Force's A4 Skyhawks made one final swooping flyover of Mount Smart Stadium followed by fireworks. The Queen, Duke of Edinburgh, and Prince Edward then exited the stadium standing in open top vehicles.

Mascot

The mascot of the games was Goldie, representing New Zealand's national symbol the kiwi bird.

Participating teams

55 teams were represented at the 1990 Games.(Teams competing for the first time are shown in bold).

Medals by country
This is the full table of the medal count of the 1990 Commonwealth Games. These rankings sort by the number of gold medals earned by a country. The number of silvers is taken into consideration next and then the number of bronze. If, after the above, countries are still tied, equal ranking is given and they are listed alphabetically. This follows the system used by the IOC, IAAF and BBC.

Figures from Commonwealth Games Foundation website.

Medals by event
At these games, the Triathlon was a demonstration event; won by Erin Baker (women) and Rick Wells (men), both from New Zealand.

Aquatics

Athletics

Badminton

Bowls

Boxing

Cycling

Track

Road

Gymnastics

Artistic

Rhythmic

Judo

Shooting

Pistol

Rifle

Shotgun

Weightlifting

References

The Bateman New Zealand Encyclopedia

External links
 Commonwealth Games Official Site

 
C
Sports competitions in Auckland
International sports competitions hosted by New Zealand
Commonwealth Games in New Zealand
Commonwealth Games by year
Commonwealth Games
Gymnastics competitions in New Zealand
January 1990 sports events in New Zealand
February 1990 sports events in New Zealand
1990s in Auckland
1990 in New Zealand
1990s in New Zealand